Tatosoma agrionata is a species of moth in the family Geometridae first described by Francis Walker in 1862. It is endemic to New Zealand. It is classified as at risk, declining by the Department of Conservation.

Taxonomy 
T. agrionata was first described by Francis Walker in 1862 using specimens collected either in Hawke Bay or Taupo by William Colenso. Walker originally named the species Cidaria agrionata. In the same publication Walker, thinking it was a separate species, again described the moth under the name Cidaria collectaria. In 1988 John S. Dugdale synonymised this name. George Vernon Hudson discussed and illustrated this species in his 1928 book The Butterflies and Moths of New Zealand. The lectotype specimen is held in the Natural History Museum, London.

Description 

The larvae of this species are orange upon hatching but as they mature they turn yellow green. They are slightly paler on their underside. When mature they form a cocoon from soil and silk on the surface of the ground underneath their host plants.

Hudson described the adults of the species as follows:

T. agrionata is very similar in appearance to Tatosoma tipulata and can be confused with that species. This species can be distinguished T. tipulata as it lacks the Z-shaped basal line and has a conspicuous large pale patch near tornus. Robert Hoare has also stated that T. agrionata has is a very distinct black V on the forewing dorsum near the base that appears to be a distinguishing feature as it is not present on T. tipulata.

Distribution 
This species is endemic to New Zealand. It has occurred from the Bay of Plenty to Wellington in the North Island and from Nelson to Stewart Island. However, this species is now possibly extinct in the North Island.

Life cycle and behaviour 
Larvae of T. agrionata are slow moving. Adults emerge from July to May and it has been hypothesised that there are two generations per year. The adults of this species can be looked for resting on tree trunks.

Habitat and host plants 

T. agrionata frequents forest habitat and can be found up to an elevation of 900 m.  The host species for the larvae of this species are native leafy Loranthaceae such as Alepis flavida, Ileostylus micranthus, Peraxilla colenso, Peraxilla tetrapetala, Trilepidea adamsii and Tupeia antarctica.

Conservation status 
This moth is classified under the New Zealand Threat Classification System as being at risk, declining.

References

Moths described in 1862
Moths of New Zealand
Larentiinae
Endemic fauna of New Zealand
Endangered biota of New Zealand
Taxa named by Francis Walker (entomologist)
Endemic moths of New Zealand